Miloš Milisavljević (born 7 September 1993) is a Serbian professional basketball player for Kaposvári KK of the Hungarian League.

Professional career
Milisavljević started his senior career with Spartak Subotica. In November 2014, Milisavljević joined the Santa Cruz Warriors of the NBA D-League. On February 12, 2015, he won d league championship that year, but because of injury he played only 24 games.

In January 2016, Milisavljević signed with Spanish club ICL Manresa. After appearing in only four games, he got injured and missed the rest of the season. In June 2016, Milisavljević  returned to Serbia and signed with Mega Leks. On 5 January 2017, he left Mega and signed with Dynamic.

In July 2019, Milisavljević signed for Naturtex-SZTE-Szedeák of the Hungarian League.

References

External links 
 ACB profile
 FIBA.com profile

1993 births
Living people
Basketball League of Serbia players
Bàsquet Manresa players
KK Dynamic players
KK Mega Basket players
KK Spartak Subotica players
Liga ACB players
People from Bačka Topola
Santa Cruz Warriors players
Serbian expatriate basketball people in Hungary
Serbian expatriate basketball people in Spain
Serbian expatriate basketball people in the United States
Serbian men's basketball players
Point guards